Gafr and Parmon Rural District is a rural district (dehestan) in the Gafr and Parmon District of Bashagard County, Hormozgan Province, Iran. At the 2006 census, its population was 7,968, in 1,933 families.  The rural district has 59 villages.

References 

Rural Districts of Hormozgan Province
Bashagard County